Johnson Farm may refer to:

in the United States
(by state then town)
Johnson Farm in Saint George, Utah that houses the St. George Dinosaur Discovery Site, a fossil site and museum
Johnson Home Farm, Taylor's Bridge, Delaware, listed on the National Register of Historic Places (NRHP) in New Castle County
Quet Johnson Farm, Richfield, Idaho, listed on the NRHP in Lincoln County
Johnson-Wolfe Farm, Comus, Maryland, NRHP-listed
Atkins-Johnson Farmhouse Property, Gladstone, Missouri, listed on the NRHP in Clay County
Moss-Johnson Farm, Hendersonville, North Carolina, listed on the NRHP in Henderson County
Johnson Farm (Kipling, North Carolina), NRHP-listed
John Johnson Farm, Hiram township, Ohio, NRHP-listed
Knipe-Johnson Farm, Upper Gywnedd Township, Pennsylvania, listed on the NRHP in Montgomery County
Keener-Johnson Farm, Seymour, Tennessee, listed on the NRHP in Sevier County
Alfred Johnson Farm, Mountain City, Tennessee, listed on the NRHP in Johnson County
Dan Johnson Farmstead, Williston, Vermont, listed on the NRHP in Chittenden County
J. J. Johnson Farm, Georgetown, Texas, listed on the NRHP in Williamson County
Johnson Farm (Lake Ray Roberts, Texas), listed on the NRHP in Denton County

See also
Johnson Barn (disambiguation)
Johnson House (disambiguation)